Badr Gaddarine is a Moroccan professional footballer, who plays as a left back for Wydad AC.

References 

http://www.footballdatabase.eu/football.joueurs.badr.gaddarine.312165.en.html

1997 births
Living people
Wydad AC players
Moroccan footballers
Association football defenders